The men's kumite 75 kg competition in karate at the 2017 World Games took place on 26 July 2017 at the GEM Sports Complex in Wrocław, Poland.

Results

Elimination round

Group A

Group B

Finals
{{#invoke:RoundN|N4
|widescore=yes|bold_winner=high|team-width=200
|RD1=Semifinals
|3rdplace=yes

||{{flagIOC2athlete|Stanislav Horuna|UKR|2017 World Games}}|4||1
||{{flagIOC2athlete|Ali Asghar Asiabari|IRI|2017 World Games}}|9||0

||{{flagIOC2athlete|Stanislav Horuna|UKR|2017 World Games}}|4||2

||

References

Karate at the 2017 World Games
2017 World Games